Nightfall of Diamonds is a double live album by the Grateful Dead released in 2001. It was recorded on October 16, 1989 at Meadowlands Arena in East Rutherford and includes the full concert. This was the final date of a five-day run at the venue.

The artwork depicts the Manhattan skyline from the Hudson Waterfront of New Jersey. This show took place on Bob Weir's 42nd birthday and the band briefly plays "Happy Birthday to You" between "Stuck Inside of Mobile with the Memphis Blues Again" and "Let it Grow." More music from this period can be found on Without a Net, Postcards of the Hanging, and Formerly the Warlocks.

The liner notes give a memorial dedication to Adam Katz, a Deadhead who was mysteriously found dead after the band's show at the same venue two nights earlier.

Track listing

Disc one 
 "Picasso Moon" (John Barlow, Bob Bralove, Bob Weir) – 7:10 >
 "Mississippi Half-Step Uptown Toodelloo" > (Robert Hunter, Jerry Garcia) – 6:40
 "Feel Like a Stranger" (Barlow, Weir) – 7:38
 "Never Trust a Woman" (Brent Mydland) – 7:15
 "Built to Last" (Hunter, Garcia) – 5:20
 "Stuck Inside of Mobile with the Memphis Blues Again" (Bob Dylan) – 9:20
 "Let It Grow" > (Barlow, Weir) – 11:59
 "Deal" (Hunter, Garcia) – 8:39

Disc two 
 "Dark Star" > (Hunter, Garcia, Mickey Hart, Bill Kreutzmann, Phil Lesh, Ron McKernan, Weir) – 11:55
 "Playing in the Band" > (Hunter, Hart, Weir) – 8:02
 "Uncle John's Band" > (Hunter, Garcia) – 9:36
 "Jam" > (Grateful Dead) – 9:15
 "Drums" > (Hart, Kreutzmann) – 6:05
 "Space" > (Garcia, Lesh, Weir) – 6:01
 "I Will Take You Home" > (Mydland) – 4:27
 "I Need A Miracle" > (Barlow, Weir) – 4:02
 "Dark Star" > (Hunter, Garcia, Hart, Kreutzmann, Lesh, McKernan, Weir) – 5:20
 "Attics of My Life" > (Hunter, Garcia) – 4:45
 "Playing in the Band" (Hunter, Hart, Weir) – 4:00
 "And We Bid You Goodnight" (trad., arr. Grateful Dead) – 3:10

Personnel 
 Jerry Garcia – lead guitar, vocals
 Bob Weir – rhythm guitar, vocals
 Phil Lesh – bass guitar, vocals
 Brent Mydland – Hammond organ, keyboards, vocals
 Mickey Hart – drums, percussion
 Bill Kreutzmann – drums, percussion
 John Cutler – engineer
 Rudson Shurtliff – assistant engineer
 Jeffrey Norman – mixing
 David Lemieux – tape archivist
 Cassidy Law – album coordination
 Eileen Law – archival research
 Randy Tuten – cover design

Charts

References 

Grateful Dead live albums
2001 live albums
Grateful Dead Records live albums